Tullio India il Vecchio or Tullio India the Elder (after 1550 – 1624) was an Italian painter of the late-Renaissance period active mainly in Verona.

Biography
Described by Zannandreis as a fresco artist of non-mediocre talents, able to paint grotteschi and portraits, as respected for his copies of other works. His style is described as Raphaelesque. It is unclear who was his master, and what his relationship was to Bernardino India (1528–1590). He painted the exterior chiaroscuro frescoes of Palazzo Miniscalchi, Verona. He also painted for the churches of Santa Croce di Cittadella and San Felice di Centro in Verona.

References

1550s births
1624 deaths
16th-century Italian painters
Italian male painters
17th-century Italian painters
Painters from Verona
Italian Renaissance painters
Mannerist painters